Pavel Mikalayevich Lahun (born 12 February 1979) is a Belarusian former swimmer, who specialized in freestyle and butterfly events. He is a two-time Olympian (2000 and 2004), and a three-time medalist at the FINA World Cup.

Lagoun made his first Belarusian team at the 2000 Summer Olympics in Sydney, where he placed tenth in the 4×100 m freestyle (3:20.85), and twelfth in the 4×200 m freestyle (7:24.83), as a member of the Belarusian swimming team.

At the 2004 Summer Olympics in Athens, Lagoun qualified as an individual swimmer for the men's 100 m butterfly. He cleared a FINA B-standard entry time of 53.66 from the European Championships in Madrid, Spain. He challenged seven other swimmers on the fifth heat, including top medal favorite Milorad Čavić of Serbia and Montenegro. He raced to fifth place by 0.24 of a second behind France's Frédérick Bousquet in 53.87. Lagoun failed to advance into the semifinals, as he placed twenty-sixth overall in the preliminaries.

References

External links
Profile – Russian Swimming 

1979 births
Living people
Belarusian male swimmers
Olympic swimmers of Belarus
Swimmers at the 2000 Summer Olympics
Swimmers at the 2004 Summer Olympics
Belarusian male freestyle swimmers
Male butterfly swimmers
Sportspeople from Minsk